The Pingtung County Government is the local government of Pingtung County, Taiwan.

Organizational structures

Departments
 Civil Affairs Department
 Finance Department
 Urban and Rural Development Department
 Public Works Department
 Water Resources Department
 Education Department
 Agriculture Department
 Social Affairs Department
 Labor Affairs Department
 Land Administration Department
 Indigenous Peoples Department
 Cultural Affairs Department
 Hakka Affairs Department
 Information and Tourism Department
 Research and Evaluation Department
 General Affairs Department
 Personnel Department
 Budget, Accounting and Statistics Department
 Government Ethics Department

Agencies
 Police Bureau
 Fire and Emergency Services Bureau
 Public Health Bureau
 Environmental Protection Bureau
 Local Tax Bureau

Magistrates

Access
The county hall is accessible within walking distance north of Pingtung Station of Taiwan Railways.

See also
 Pingtung County Council

References

External links

 

Pingtung County
Local governments of the Republic of China